Neoraimondia herzogiana is a tree-like cactus (family Cactaceae) native to Bolivia.

References

Flora of Bolivia
Plants described in 1967
Cactoideae